Carr Township is the name of two townships in the U.S. state of Indiana:

 Carr Township, Clark County, Indiana
 Carr Township, Jackson County, Indiana

Indiana township disambiguation pages